Dragan Žilić (born 14 December 1974) is a Serbian footballer who plays as a goalkeeper for German amateur club SG Knopp/Wiesbach.

Club career
Žilić joined his hometown club OFK Kikinda as a trainee in 1985. He made his senior debut in the 1992–93 First League of FR Yugoslavia, as the team finished in the lower half of the standings. In the summer of 1996, Žilić was transferred to Vojvodina. He was a regular member of the team that reached the 1998 UEFA Intertoto Cup finals, losing 2–1 on aggregate to Werder Bremen.

In June 2000, Žilić moved abroad to Bulgaria and signed with CSKA Sofia on a three-year contract. He left the club by mutual agreement in February 2001, having played just two official games for the team. In July 2001, Žilić returned to his homeland and joined ambitious Sartid Smederevo. He spent four seasons with the Oklopnici, winning the Serbia and Montenegro Cup in 2003.

In July 2005, Žilić completed a controversial move to Croatian side Rijeka. The transfer caused a minor sensation in the region as it marked the first occasion that a Serbian-born player joined a Croatian club after the Yugoslav Wars. Despite being exposed to severe verbal abuse by the nationalist supporters of Rijeka, Žilić immediately established himself as the first-choice goalkeeper and gradually earned the support of fans with his consistent performances. He played an important role in helping them win the 2005–06 Croatian Cup. On 29 November 2006, Žilić scored a 92nd-minute header against Konavljanin that pushed Rijeka into the 2006–07 Croatian Cup semi-finals. He would lose his place in the first team by the fall of 2008, being demoted to as low as training with the youth team. In the 2009 winter transfer window, Žilić signed with Slovenian club Gorica on a free transfer. He retired from professional football after the 2009–10 season.

In early 2015, at the age of 40, Žilić came out of retirement to play for German amateur club Gençlerbirliği Homburg in the Bezirksliga. He became player-manager of Landesliga club SpVgg Einöd-Ingweiler in October of the same year.

International career
Žilić made his international debut for FR Yugoslavia in a 1–1 away friendly draw against Brazil on 23 September 1998. He came on as a second-half substitute for Ivica Kralj and kept a clean sheet in the process. After nearly four years of absence, Žilić returned to the squad in a 2–1 friendly win over Mexico at Bank One Ballpark on 13 February 2002. He earned a total of eight caps for the national team between 1998 and 2003.

Post-playing career
Following his initial retirement in 2010, Žilić served as president of his parent club OFK Kikinda.

Career statistics

Club

International

Honours
Sartid Smederevo
 Serbia and Montenegro Cup: 2002–03
Rijeka
 Croatian Cup: 2005–06

References

External links
 
 
 

Association football goalkeepers
Croatian Football League players
Expatriate footballers in Bulgaria
Expatriate footballers in Croatia
Expatriate footballers in Germany
Expatriate footballers in Slovenia
First League of Serbia and Montenegro players
FK Smederevo players
FK Vojvodina players
HNK Rijeka players
Landesliga players
ND Gorica players
OFK Kikinda players
PFC CSKA Sofia players
Second League of Serbia and Montenegro players
Serbia and Montenegro expatriate footballers
Serbia and Montenegro expatriate sportspeople in Bulgaria
Serbia and Montenegro expatriate sportspeople in Croatia
Serbia and Montenegro footballers
Serbia and Montenegro international footballers
Serbian expatriate footballers
Serbian expatriate sportspeople in Croatia
Serbian expatriate sportspeople in Germany
Serbian expatriate sportspeople in Slovenia
Serbian footballers
Slovenian PrvaLiga players
Sportspeople from Kikinda
1974 births
Living people